Pseudamycus is a spider enus of the jumping spider family, Salticidae. The monotypic genus Taivala is thought to be closely related.

Appearance
These jumping spiders are light or colorful, sometimes iridescent. The cephalothorax is high, with steep sides of the thorax. The eyes protrude from the head, located within an orange-brown eye field. The rest of the carapace is greyish-orange, the abdomen light grey-brown with dots and light and dark streaks on the sides. The first pair of legs are dark brown with yellow tarsi, the other three pairs are reddish yellow and spiny.

Habits
They live on shrubs and other, mostly broad leaved plants, for example ginger.

Distribution
The ten species are found in Southeast Asia, from India to New Britain (New Guinea).

Name
The genus is combined of Greek pseudo "false" and the salticid genus name Amycus.

Species
 Pseudamycus albomaculatus (Hasselt, 1882) – Malaysia to Java
 Pseudamycus amabilis Peckham & Peckham, 1907 – Borneo
 Pseudamycus bhutani Zabka, 1990 – Bhutan
 Pseudamycus canescens Simon, 1899 – Sumatra
 Pseudamycus evarchanus Strand, 1915 – New Britain
 Pseudamycus flavopubescens Simon, 1899 – Sumatra
 Pseudamycus hasselti Zabka, 1985 – Vietnam
 Pseudamycus himalaya (Tikader, 1967) – India
 Pseudamycus sylvestris Peckham & Peckham, 1907 – Borneo
 Pseudamycus validus (Thorell, 1877) – Sulawesi

Footnotes

References
 Platnick, N. I. (2007). The world spider catalog, version 7.5. American Museum of Natural History.

Salticidae
Spiders of Asia
Salticidae genera